The Wayne National Forest is located in the south-eastern part of the US state of Ohio, in the Unglaciated Allegheny Plateau.  It is the only national forest in Ohio. Forest headquarters are located between The Plains and Nelsonville, Ohio, on US Route 33, overlooking the Hocking River.

The originally forested land was cleared for agricultural and lumbering use in the late 18th and 19th century, but years of poor timbering and agricultural practices led to severe erosion and poor soil composition. The Wayne National Forest was started as part of a reforestation program.

The forest comprises three administrative and purchase units: Athens, Marietta, and Ironton. The Athens and Marietta Units are managed together as the Athens Ranger District, while the Ironton Unit is managed as the Ironton Ranger District. Many of the lands included in the national forest are former coal-mining lands, and much of this land is owned by the federal government without the mineral rights, those having been retained by former owners.

 The Athens Unit is located in Athens, Hocking, Morgan, Perry, and Vinton Counties, and includes 67,224 acres (272 km²) as of 2002. It features the Wildcat Hollow Trail, a hiking trail just northeast of Burr Oak State Park in Morgan County; the Stone Church Horse Trail in Perry County; the Utah Ridge Recreation Area in Athens County, and the Dorr Run ATV Trails in Hocking County.
 The Marietta Unit is located in Monroe, Noble, and Washington Counties, and includes 63,381 acres (256 km²) as of 2002, with over half of the total being within Washington County.
 The Ironton Unit is located in Gallia, Jackson, Lawrence, and Scioto Counties, and includes 99,049 acres (401 km²) as of 2002, with over two-thirds of the total being within Lawrence County.

The North Country Trail passes through several areas of the Wayne, in which it is coincident with the Buckeye Trail and the American Discovery Trail. The area of Ohio included within the national forest is based on late Paleozoic geology, heavy in sandstones and shales, including redbeds, with many coal beds. The topography is typically very rugged, with elevation changes typically in the 200–400-foot range.

References

External links
 Wayne National Forest Official Website
 A Forest Returns: The Success Story of Ohio's Only National Forest –- oral history on the beginnings of the Wayne.
  Economic Analysis of the 2006 Wayne National Forest Plan – a critical analysis of future USFS plans for the Wayne
  An oral history on the beginnings of the Wayne.

National Forests of Ohio
National Forests of the Appalachians
Allegheny Plateau
Protected areas of Athens County, Ohio
Protected areas of Hocking County, Ohio
Protected areas of Vinton County, Ohio
Protected areas of Perry County, Ohio
Protected areas of Morgan County, Ohio
Protected areas of Washington County, Ohio
Protected areas of Lawrence County, Ohio
Protected areas of Gallia County, Ohio
Protected areas of Jackson County, Ohio
Protected areas of Monroe County, Ohio
Protected areas of Noble County, Ohio
Protected areas of Scioto County, Ohio
1992 establishments in Ohio
Protected areas established in 1992